"No Reply at All" is a song by British band Genesis, released as the lead single in the US from their 1981 album Abacab. It was not released in the UK, where "Abacab" was the first single.   The US single release edit omits the second verse of the song as it appears on the Abacab album.

Structure
This song, like Phil Collins' solo track "I Missed Again" (recorded at around the same time), makes prominent use of a horn section, arranged by Tom Tom 84 (i.e. Thomas Washington, horn arranger for Earth, Wind & Fire) and played by that band's wind players, credited on the song as "EWF Horns". The song marks a step toward the mainstream pop direction Genesis was taking at the time, yet it still contains elements of their past: complex, melodic bass riffs, and a cross-hand technique on a Prophet-5, similar to the style used for the intro to "The Lamb Lies Down on Broadway."

The song was released as the first single from Abacab in the U.S., and reached the U.S. Top 30 in the fall of 1981.  "No Reply at All" spent 18 weeks on the Billboard Hot 100, longer than most of their hits which reached the Top 10, including "Invisible Touch", which spent only 17 weeks on the chart.

Record World praised "Michael Rutherford's playful bass figures and Phil Collins' inventive drumming."

The song was performed live by Phish as a tribute to Genesis at the Rock and Roll Hall of Fame's 2010 induction ceremony. Phish also performed "Watcher of the Skies" that night.

Music video
The music video features only the band. Cameras revolve around the band playing their parts in a rehearsal setting. When the horn part is prominent, it cuts to a different shot of the band – wearing hats, sunglasses, and jackets to conceal their identity – playing the trumpet, saxophone and trombone.

Personnel 

 Phil Collins – drums, lead and backing vocals
 Tony Banks – Yamaha CP-70 electric grand piano, Prophet-5
 Mike Rutherford – electric guitar, bass guitar 
 Phenix Horns – horns

Chart performance

Weekly charts

Year-end charts

References 

1981 singles
Genesis (band) songs
1981 songs
Songs written by Phil Collins
Songs written by Tony Banks (musician)
Songs written by Mike Rutherford
Charisma Records singles
Virgin Records singles
Atlantic Records singles
Songs about loneliness
Torch songs